The 4th Moscow International Film Festival was held from 5 to 20 July 1965. The Grand Prix was shared between the Soviet film War and Peace directed by Sergei Bondarchuk and the Hungarian film Twenty Hours directed by Zoltán Fábri.

Jury
 Sergei Gerasimov (USSR - President of the Jury)
 Veljko Bulajić (Yugoslavia)
 Zoltán Várkonyi (Hungary)
 Marina Vlady (France)
 Mircea Drăgan (Romania)
 Raj Kapoor (India)
 Grigori Kozintsev (USSR)
 Jiří Marek (Czechoslovakia)
 Czesław Petelski (Poland)
 Kiyohiko Ushihara (Japan)
 Leonardo Fioravanti (Italy)
 Fred Zinnemann (USA)
 Kamil Yarmatov (USSR)

Films in competition
The following films were selected for the main competition:

Awards
 Grand Prix:
 War and Peace and Sergei Bondarchuk
 Twenty Hours and Zoltán Fábri
 Golden Prizes:
 Heaven on One's Head by Yves Ciampi
 Atentát by Jiří Sequens
 Special Silver Prize: The Camp Followers by Valerio Zurlini
 Silver Prizes:
 Three Steps on Earth by Jerzy Hoffman and Edward Skórzewski
 The Great Race by Blake Edwards
 Prizes:
 Best Actor: Sergo Zakariadze for Father of a Soldier
 Best Actress: Sophia Loren for Marriage Italian-Style
 Best Director: Ion Popescu-Gopo for The White Moor
 Director of Photography: Tomislav Pinter for Prometheus of the Island
 So Young a Peace by Jacques Charby
 The Adventures of Werner Holt by Joachim Kunert
 Bull by Nikola Korabov
 Special Diplomas:
 Director: Susumu Hani for Children Hand in Hand
 Director: Vatroslav Mimica for Prometheus of the Island
 Actor: Bourvil for The Sucker
 4x4 by Palle Kjærulff-Schmidt, Klaus Rifbjerg, Rolf Clemens, Maunu Kurkvaara, Jan Troell
 Diplomas:
 Actress: Ludmila Savelyeva for War and Peace
 Actress: Julie Christie for Darling
 Prix FIPRESCI:
 Twenty Hours and Zoltán Fábri
 Dvoye by Mikhail Bogin

References

External links
Moscow International Film Festival: 1965 at Internet Movie Database

1965
1965 film festivals
1965 in the Soviet Union
1965 in Moscow